Seychelles Workers Union (SWU) is a national trade union center in Seychelles.

Trade unions in Seychelles